Holme-Olstrup is a small railway town between Næstved and Haslev, on the south central part of the Danish island of Zealand, at the railroad Lille Syd. It is situated in Næstved Municipality, Region Zealand and has a population of 1,259 (1 January 2022).

The amusement park BonBon-Land is located on the eastern outskirts of the town.

References

Cities and towns in Region Zealand